Castle Rock State Park is the name of two parks in the United States:

Castle Rock State Park (California) 
Castle Rock State Park (Illinois)